Lady Soul may refer to:

In music:
 Lady Soul a 1968 album by Aretha Franklin
 Lady Soul (song) a 1986 single by The Temptations
 Lady Soul (Aco album) a 1998 album by Japanese singer-songwriter Aco